St. Elizabeth's Cathedral ( or Catedral de Malabo) is a Roman Catholic cathedral located on Independencia Avenue (Avenida de la Independencia) in the city of Malabo, the capital of Equatorial Guinea, home of the Archdiocese of Malabo. It is considered the largest Christian church in the nation.  It was named after St. Elizabeth of Hungary. The cathedral was seriously damaged by fire on January 16, 2020 while restoration work was underway.

Construction
Its construction began in 1897 with donations from parishioners, commercial companies and the Spanish government, for it was one of its colonies. The architect of the monument was Luis Segarra Llairadó, and was inaugurated in 1916.

It is built in a neo-Gothic style that emphasizes its façade, flanked by two  towers, and a nave with two aisles.

See also
Roman Catholicism in Equatorial Guinea
St. Elizabeth's Church (disambiguation)

References

Roman Catholic cathedrals in Equatorial Guinea
Buildings and structures in Malabo
Roman Catholic churches completed in 1916
20th-century Roman Catholic church buildings
Gothic Revival church buildings in Equatorial Guinea